Otis Herman Burnett (January 7, 1872–August 10, 1906) was an American lawyer, businessman, and politician.

Burnett was born in Williamson County, Illinois and went to the Williamson County public schools. He worked as a cashier at the bank in Marion, Illinois. Burnett graduated from Valparaiso University in 1892 and from Yale Law School in 1899. Burnett was admitted to the Illinois bar in 1899 and practiced law in Marion, Illinois. Burnett served in the Illinois Senate from 1901 to his death in 1906. He was a Republican. Burnett died at his home in Marion, Illinois from a brief illness.

Notes

External links

1872 births
1906 deaths
People from Marion, Illinois
Valparaiso University alumni
Harvard Law School alumni
Businesspeople from Illinois
Illinois lawyers
Republican Party Illinois state senators
19th-century American politicians
19th-century American businesspeople